International Materials Reviews is a peer-reviewed scientific journal by Maney Publishing.

Abstracting and indexing 
International Materials Reviews is abstracted and indexed the following bibliographic databases:
Science Citation Index Expanded
Scopus

According to the Journal Citation Reports, the journal has a 2020 impact factor of 19.559.

References

External links 
 

English-language journals